Playmates is a 1941 American comedy film directed by David Butler and written by James V. Kern. The film stars Kay Kyser, John Barrymore (in his final film), Lupe Vélez, Ginny Simms, May Robson and Patsy Kelly. It was released on December 26, 1941 by RKO Radio Pictures.

Plot
Lulu Monahan, press agent for John Barrymore, tries to attract a sponsor for Barrymore's radio program. Lulu and bandleader Kay Kyser's agent concoct a story that a great actor will teach Kyser how to play Shakespeare.

Cast
 Kay Kyser as Kay Kyser
 John Barrymore as John Barrymore
 Lupe Vélez as Carmen Del Toro
 Ginny Simms as Ginny Simms
 May Robson as Grandma Kyser
 Patsy Kelly as Lulu Monahan
 Peter Lind Hayes as Peter Lindsay 
 Ish Kabibble as Ish Kabibble
 Sully Mason as Sully Mason
 Harry Babbitt as Harry Babbitt
 Leon Belasco as Prince Maharoohu
 George Cleveland as Mr. Pennypacker (uncredited)
 Alice Fleming as Mrs. Pennypacker (uncredited)

References

External links
 
 
 
 

1941 films
1941 comedy films
American comedy films
American black-and-white films
Films scored by Roy Webb
Films directed by David Butler
RKO Pictures films
1940s English-language films
1940s American films